St. Elmo Society, or Elmo's, is a secret society at Yale University. It was founded in 1889 as an independent entity for seniors within the nationally chartered fraternity, Delta Phi (ΔΦ), Omicron chapter (1889–1925).

Delegations are selected from the entire junior class pool based on students' scholastic standing, his or her seriousness of purpose, maturity, individuality, and other achievements at the university as well as representation of the different backgrounds and interests in each class. There are eight men and eight women in each year's delegation.

History 

Founded in 1889 as an unincorporated association within Delta Phi, St. Elmo was the third senior society (after Berzelius, 1848; and Book and Snake, 1863) at the Sheffield Scientific School, Yale's sciences and engineering college from 1854 to 1956. These Sheffield Societies were once populated by members from the sophomore, junior, and senior classes, who maintained separate residential quarters within their societies' tombs. St. Elmo's is a member of the “ancient eight consortium” which includes the seven other original societies at Yale: Skull and Bones, Scroll and Key, Wolf's Head, Book and Snake, Elihu, Berzelius, and Mace and Chain.

The society's original club house, at 111 Grove Street, was built in 1895.

In June 1905, the group incorporated under Connecticut state law to form the St. Elmo Corporation, with the primary purpose of holding the title to 111 Grove Street and financial assets.

In 1912, the society built a new clubhouse next door at 109 Grove Street. Dubbed St. Elmo Hall, it was constructed from designs by Kenneth M. Murchison that echoed an Elizabethan manor house.

In July 1925, the Omicron chapter of Delta Phi, and, in turn, the society, severed its ties with the national fraternity and became an independent organization.

The creation of Yale's residential college system in 1933 led some Sheffield organizations to sell their buildings, but St. Elmo's (along with some others) pressed on, incorporating itself as the Rhinelander Trust Association.

In late 1956, the corporation lost its incorporation status due to clerical errors but reincorporated in 1964 as St. Elmo Incorporated.

In 1962, Yale, which had leased dormitory space in the Hall since 1945, bought the building from Elmo's. The university leased part of it to the society, with the understanding that the university would continue to do so; the hall is now known as Rosenfeld Hall.

In 1965, a decade after the Sheffield school had been incorporated into Yale College, St. Elmo became a secret society in the traditional sense of Skull and Bones (1832), Scroll and Key (1841), and Wolf's Head (1883), which had selected its members from the Academic Department (the liberal arts college).

In 1985, the university refused to renew St. Elmo's lease at 109 Grove Street, leaving the society with little time to move out and nowhere to go. The following year, St. Elmo moved to a building at 35 Lynwood Place.  St. Elmo Society, Inc. owns the property, like other “landed” or “above-ground” societies that are run by private organizations.

As of 2008, the renamed Rosenfeld Hall is used for residential annex and classroom space, and most of the cryptic and historic areas are used for furniture storage or have been boarded up.

Membership 

Notable members include:
 Harry Valette Day (1895), president, manager, and first member of the board of directors of Custer Consolidated Mining Company, which in 1913 merged with the adjacent Tamarack & Chesapeake Mining Company, forming the Tamarack & Custer Consolidated Mining Company
 Charles James Freeborn (1899), Croix de Guerre recipient for his service in World War I and captain in the United States Army
 Guy Hutchinson (1906), president of Proctor & Schwartz Electric Company, which merged with Silex Company to form Proctor Silex in 1960; he was also an All-American Football quarterback, 1905
 Arthur Harding Bosworth (1908), founder and president of Bosworth, Chanute, Loughridge & Co, which eventually merged with RBC Wealth Management
 Robert Bensen Meyer (1914), Navy Cross recipient for his service in World War I and lieutenant in the United States Navy
 Fotzhugh Quarrier (1935), colonel in World War II in the N.Y. Air Defense Wing and assisted Eleanor Roosevelt in organizing the WAACs
 Ivan Obolensky (1947), Naval pilot, Pulitzer Prize publisher, vice president of Shields & Company, long-time financial analyst, son of Prince Serge Obolensky, Russian Prince and vice chairman of the board of Hilton Hotels Corporation, and grandson of John Jacob Astor IV, great-grandson of John Jacob Astor
James E. Fuchs (1950), Olympic medalist, 1948 and 1952, Pan-American Games medalist, and former world record holder, shot put. President, chairman, and executive director of the Silver Shield Foundation; chairman and co-chief executive of the Cosamar Group Inc.; former chairman and chief executive officer of The Grenfox Group Inc.; former senior advisor to the committee to Encourage Corporate Philanthropy; former CEO of Fuchs, Cuthrell & Co Inc.
 Robert Morse Crunden (1962), professor at the University of Texas, director of American Studies Department, 1985–1990, member of the History Department as well
 John Ashcroft (1964), 79th United States Attorney General
 Barrington Daniels Parker Jr. (1965), a federal judge on the United States Court of Appeals for the Second Circuit
 Calvin Hill (1969), All-Pro NFL running back; father of NBA All-Star, Grant Hill
 James L. Shulman (1987), author and president of ARTstor
Matt McCarthy (2002), author of Odd Man Out, which was ranked number 21 on the New York Times Non-Fiction Best Seller List in March 2009
Allison Williams (2010), actress, Jordan Peele's Get Out, HBO's Girls

See also 
Secret Societies at Yale University
Collegiate secret societies in North America

References

Sources 
 How the Secret Societies Got That Way
 Yale Alumni Magazine 2001
 NY Times Article, St. Elmo Hall 1
 NY Times Article, St. Elmo Hall 2
 New York Times Article, St. Elmo Society
 Sheffield Scientific School Recordings
 Yale Organizations 1780–1960
 Sheffield Scientific School Obituary 1951–1952
 Tombs and Taps: An inside look at Yale's Fraternities, Sororities and Societies
 Buildings & Grounds
 Inside Yale's Secret Societies
 Secret societies: tombs and tradition
 Light and Truth
 St. Anthony

Secret societies at Yale
1889 establishments in Connecticut
Student organizations established in 1889